Tasneem Yasin Abdel-Rahman Abu-Rob (born 14 November 2000), known as Tasneem Abu-Rob, is a Jordanian footballer who plays as a midfielder for local Women's League club Shabab Al-Ordon and the Jordan women's national team.

International goals
Scores and results list Jordan's goal tally first.

References

External links

2000 births
Living people
Jordanian women's footballers
Jordan women's international footballers
Women's association football midfielders
Sportspeople from Amman
Jordanian Muslims
Jordan Women's Football League players